The Baoji Bronzeware Museum is an archaeology museum in Baoji, Shaanxi, China. It has a collection of more than 120,000 pieces of cultural relics through the ages, most of them are Zhou dynasty bronze wares.

Several Zhou dynasty sites have been excavated within the Baoji region.

History
The museum was first constructed in 1956 as the Baoji Historical Relics Exhibition Hall. It was renowned for its bronze wares, . In 1958, it was renamed as the Baoji Museum. At that time, it had a collection of more than 110,000 objects, including 5,740 bronze wares.

In 1990, the construction of its new building began and the museum was completed in 1998, and opened to the public on September 8, 1998 as the Baoji Bronzeware Museum.

In 2006, the construction of the present building began and the museum was completed on September 28, 2010.

Gallery

See also
 List of museums in China

References

External links
 

Museums in Shaanxi
History museums in China
Museums established in 1956
1956 establishments in China
Buildings and structures in Baoji
Museums established in 1998
1998 establishments in China
Chinese bronzeware
National first-grade museums of China